Stevie Wonder Live is a 1970 live album by American musician Stevie Wonder on the Tamla (Motown) label. The second live collection by the singer-songwriter, it was released during the crossroads of Wonder's career as he was preparing to negotiate a new contract with Motown that gave him artistic control over his work.

The M.C. heard on the recording is veteran Detroit DJ Scott Regen, who can also be heard on the 1966 albums Temptations Live! and Four Tops Live!.

At 60:37 long, this was a remarkably long running time for a single LP, especially for 1970 when albums typically ran for 35-40 minutes.

Track listing
"Intro/For Once in My Life/Pretty World" (Antonio Adolfo, Alan Bergman, Marilyn Bergman, Tiberio Gaspar) - 3:39
"Sunny" (Bobby Hebb) - 2:41
"Love Theme from Romeo and Juliet (A Time for Us)" (Nino Rota, Eddie Snyder, Larry Kusik) - 3:10
"Shoo-Be-Doo-Be-Doo-Da-Day" (Henry Cosby, Sylvia Moy, Stevie Wonder) - 5:47
"Everybody's Talkin'" (Fred Neil) - 2:49
"My Cherie Amour" (Henry Cosby, Sylvia Moy, Stevie Wonder) - 2:55
"Yester-Me, Yester-You, Yesterday" (Ron Miller, Bryan Wells) - 2:43
"I've Gotta Be Me/Once in a Lifetime" (Leslie Bricusse, Walter Marks, Anthony Newley) - 5:50
"A Place in the Sun" (Ron Miller, Bryan Wells) - 2:20
"Down to Earth" (Ron Miller, William O'Malley, Avery Vandenberg) - 2:24
"Blowin' in the Wind" (Bob Dylan) - 6:39
"By the Time I Get to Phoenix" (Jimmy Webb) - 4:00
"Ca' Purange" (Mussapere) - 6:45
"Alfie" (Burt Bacharach, Hal David) - 5:25
"For Once in My Life/Thank You Love" (Ron Miller, Orlando Murden/Henry Cosby, Ron Miller, Sylvia Moy, Stevie Wonder) - 3:30

Personnel
 Stevie Wonder - vocals; clavinet on "Shoo-Be-Doo-Bee-Doo-Da-Day"; Italian vocals on "A Place in the Sun"; drum solo on "Ca' Purange"
 Scott Regen - M.C.

1970 live albums
Stevie Wonder live albums
Tamla Records live albums